The Franken Challenge (former Schickedanz Open) is a professional tennis tournament played on outdoor red clay courts. It is currently part of the Association of Tennis Professionals (ATP) Challenger Tour. It is held annually in Fürth, Germany, since 1979 (as a club event from 1979 to 1985, as a Futures in 1986, as a Challenger since 1987). After having been on the calendar for 38 years, the 2017 edition had to be cancelled for lack of funding.

Past finals

Singles

Doubles

References

External links
Official website

 
ATP Challenger Tour
Clay court tennis tournaments
Tennis tournaments in Germany
Sport in Fürth
Recurring sporting events established in 1979
1979 establishments in West Germany